Vaginal flatulence is an emission or expulsion of air from the vagina. It may occur during or after sexual intercourse or during other sexual acts, stretching or exercise. The sound is often comparable to flatulence from the anus, but does not involve waste gases, and thus often does not have a specific odor associated. Slang terms for vaginal flatulence include queef, vart, and fanny fart (mostly British).

Serious conditions
Vaginal gas with a strong odor of fecal matter may be a result of colovaginal fistula, a serious condition involving a tear between the vagina and colon, which can result from surgery, child birth, diseases (such as Crohn's disease), or other causes. This condition can lead to urinary tract infection and other complications.  Vaginal gas can also be a symptom of an internal female genital prolapse, a condition most often caused by childbirth.

Puffs or small amounts of air passed into the vaginal cavity during cunnilingus are not known to cause any issues. However, "forcing" or purposely blowing air at force into the vaginal cavity can cause an air embolism, which in very rare cases can be dangerous for the woman, and if pregnant, for the fetus.

References

External links

Flatulence
Vagina